David Rubenstein may refer to:
 David Rubenstein, financier, private equity investor and founder of The Carlyle Group
 David Rubenstein (activist), founding executive director of the Save Darfur Coalition

See also
David Rubinstein (disambiguation)